Randal Hayes Stageberg born November 26, 1990 in Chesapeake, Virginia, is an American gymnast. She started gymnastics at the age of 4 at Ocean Tumblers and in 2001 moved to Excalibur Gymnastics to train under Jim and Dena Walker. She graduated from the University of Florida in 2013.

References

External links

1990 births
Living people
American female artistic gymnasts
U.S. women's national team gymnasts
21st-century American women